WVG may refer to:

Watts Varrio Grape, a predecessor gang to the Grape Street Watts Crips
The policy area covering Welfare, Public Health and Family in the Flemish Government
Westfälische Verkehrsgesellschaft, a company involved in providing buses for Brilon Stadt station